Francesca Bonnemaison i Farriols (12 April 1872 – 1949) was a Spanish Catalan educator and promoter of female education in Catalonia. She established Biblioteca Popular de la Dona (lit. Popular Library of Women), first library exclusively for women in Europe, in Barcelona in 1909.

Early life
Bonnemaison was born on 12 April 1872 in Barcelona to father of French origin and Catalan mother. Her father was an affluent businessman. She was given a strong religious upbringing and learnt different languages, painting and music in her early life.

In 1893, at the age of 21, she married Narcís Verdaguer i Callís, a lawyer and politician. She collaborated with him at his law firm.

Female education

Bonnemaison devised a project, Women's Popular Library and the Culture Institute, in 1909 to provide opportunity to single, working-class women to get education. She established first library exclusively for women in Europe, Biblioteca Popular de la Dona (which was rechristened Biblioteca Francesca Bonnemaison), at Sant Pere, Santa Caterina i la Ribera, Barcelona.

References

1872 births
1949 deaths
People from Barcelona
Spanish feminists
Burials at Montjuïc Cemetery
Spanish educators
Spanish women educators